Austrosticta fieldi
Austrosticta frater
Austrosticta soror
Cnemisticta angustilobata
Cnemisticta latilobata
Eurysticta coolawanyah
Eurysticta coomalie
Eurysticta kununurra
Isosticta banksi
Isosticta gracilior
Isosticta handschini
Isosticta humilior
Isosticta robustior
Isosticta spinipes
Isosticta tillyardi
Labidiosticta vallisi
Lithosticta macra
Neosticta canescens
Neosticta fraseri
Neosticta silvarum
Oristicta filicicola
Rhadinosticta banksi
Rhadinosticta simplex
Selysioneura aglaia
Selysioneura arboricola
Selysioneura bacillus
Selysioneura capreola
Selysioneura cervicornu
Selysioneura cornelia
Selysioneura drymobia
Selysioneura phasma
Selysioneura ranatra
Selysioneura rangifera
Selysioneura rhaphia
Selysioneura stenomantis
Selysioneura thalia
Selysioneura umbratilis
Selysioneura venilia
Selysioneura virgula
Tanymecosticta capillaris
Tanymecosticta filiformis
Tanymecosticta fissicollis
Tanymecosticta jejuna
Tanymecosticta leptalea
Tanymecosticta simonae
Titanosticta macrogaster

References